Esther Süss (born 19 March 1974) is a Swiss cross-country mountain biker. At the 2012 Summer Olympics, she competed in the Women's cross-country at Hadleigh Farm, finishing in 5th place.

Süss raced the Absa Cape Epic in 2011 alongside Barti Bucher placing 1st in the Mixed Category. She came 1st again in 2012 in the Women's Category, this time with teammate Sally Bigham. Süss raced again with Bigham in 2014 and finished second, behind new champions Ariane Kleinhans and world champion Annika Langvad.

In March, 2017, Süss, riding with Sweden's Jennie Stenerhag, picked up her second Absa Cape Epic women's title.

References

Swiss mountain bikers
Swiss female cyclists
1974 births
Living people
Olympic cyclists of Switzerland
Cyclists at the 2012 Summer Olympics
Place of birth missing (living people)
UCI Mountain Bike World Champions (women)
21st-century Swiss women